Napoléon Joseph Ney, 2nd Prince de la Moskowa, (1803–1857) was a French politician.

Ney was the elder son of Michel Ney. Born in Paris in 1803, his godfather was Emperor Napoléon I. He married in 1828 the daughter of the banker Pierre Laffite.  In November 1831 he was created a peer of France in a batch of thirty-six lifetime peers.

Sources
 Souvenirs et récits par le Prince de la Moskowa (in French)
 Arrêt Prince Napoléon (in French)
 Blog of the Ney family (in French)

1803 births
1857 deaths
19th-century French people
Princes de la Moskowa
Politicians from Paris
Members of the Chamber of Peers of the July Monarchy